The 1979–80 season was Aston Villa's 80th in the Football League and their fifth consecutive season in the top division. 

8 September 1979: The national transfer record fee is broken for the second time in four days when Wolverhampton Wanderers pay almost £1,500,000 for Aston Villa and Scotland striker Andy Gray.

October 1979: John Gidman is sold to Everton for £650,000 (2013: £) in a deal which sees midfielder Pat Heard move the other way at a valuation of £100,000.  Heard would make nine appearances in his first season at Villa Park.

8 March 1980: Second Division West Ham United beat Aston Villa 1–0 in the FA Cup sixth round.

28 April 1980: Arsenal and Liverpool require another replay after drawing 1–1 again in their FA Cup semi-final second replay at Villa Park.

3 May 1980: Liverpool clinch the league title in their penultimate league game of the season by beating Aston Villa 4–1 at Anfield.

League table

Squad

References

External links
avfchistory.co.uk 1979-80 season

Aston Villa F.C. seasons
Aston Villa F.C. season